The 2007 Monterey Sports Car Championships was the 12th and final race of the 2007 American Le Mans Series season.  It took place at Mazda Raceway Laguna Seca, California on October 20, 2007.

Official results
Class winners in bold.  Cars failing to complete 70% of winner's distance marked as Not Classified (NC).

Statistics
 Pole Position - #6 Penske Racing - 1:10.528
 Fastest Lap - #6 Penske Racing - 1:12.127

References

Monterey
Monterey Sports Car Championships